Khabul Shah (died 1370) was khan of the Chagatai Khanate from 1364 to 1370.

Khabul Shah was raised to the head of the Chagatai ulus in 1364 by Amir Husayn, who was at the time the most powerful tribal leader in the region and who had recently withstood an invasion by the Eastern Chaghadaids of Moghulistan. Khabul Shah remained a puppet for Amir Husayn during his reign. In 1370 he was executed by forces of Timur, who had a short time before taken control of the ulus from Amir Husayn.

References

Manz, Beatrice Forbes, The Rise and Rule of Tamerlane. Cambridge University Press, 1989, .

1370 deaths
Chagatai khans
14th-century monarchs in Asia
Year of birth unknown